Kim Min-kyu (born 1 April 1998) is a South Korean footballer currently playing as a defender for Seoul E-Land.

Career statistics

Club

Notes

References

External links 

1998 births
Living people
South Korean footballers
Association football defenders
K League 2 players
Korea National League players
Seongnam FC players
Hwaseong FC players
Gimhae FC players
Seoul E-Land FC players